The 1874 Birthday Honours were appointments by Queen Victoria to various orders and honours to reward and highlight good works by citizens of the British Empire. The appointments were made to celebrate the official birthday of the Queen, and were published in The London Gazette in May and June 1874.

The recipients of honours are displayed here as they were styled before their new honour, and arranged by honour, with classes (Knight, Knight Grand Cross, etc.) and then divisions (Military, Civil, etc.) as appropriate.

United Kingdom and British Empire

Duke and Earl
His Royal Highness Prince Arthur William Patrick Albert  as Earl of Sussex and Duke of Connaught and of Strathearn

The Most Honourable Order of the Bath

Companion of the Order of the Bath (CB)

Civil Division
Robert Hawthorn Collins, Private Secretary to His Royal Highness the Prince Leopold

The Most Exalted Order of the Star of India

Knight Commander (KCSI)
Robert Henry Davies  Bengal Civil Service, Lieutenant-Governor of the Punjab
Colonel Richard John Meade  Bengal Staff Corps, Chief Commissioner of Mysore and Coorg
Colonel Lewis Pelly  Bombay Staff Corps, Agent to the Governor-General for the States of Rajpootana, and late Political Resident in the Persian Gulf

Companion (CSI)
The Honourable Ashley Eden, Bengal Civil Service, Chief Commissioner of British Burmah
Rajah Ramanath Tagore, Member of the Council of the Governor-General of India, for making Laws and Regulations
Vernon Hugh Schalch, Bengal Civil Service, Member of the Revenue Board, and of the Council of the Lieutenant-Governor of Bengal, for making Laws and Regulations

The Most Distinguished Order of Saint Michael and Saint George

Knight Grand Cross of the Order of St Michael and St George (GCMG)
John Hawley Glover, sometime Commander in Our Navy, and lately Our Special Commissioner to the Friendly Native Chiefs in the Eastern District of the Protected Territories near or adjacent to Our Settlements on the Gold Coast

Knight Commander of the Order of St Michael and St George (KCMG)
Colonel Francis Worgan Festing  lately in Command of Our Troops within Our Settlements on the Gold Coast
Colonel Stephen John Hill  Governor of the Colony of Newfoundland
Colonel William Francis Drummond Jervois  Royal Engineers, Deputy Director of Works for Fortifications, War Department
Penrose Goodchild Julyan  Crown-Agent for the Colonies

Companion of the Order of St Michael and St George (CMG)
Colonel Robert William Harley  late Administrator of Our Settlements on the Gold Coast
Captain the Honourable Edmund Robert Fremantle  lately in Command of Our Naval Forces on the Gold Coast
Roger Tuckfield Goldsworthy, lately Our Deputy Commissioner and Second in Command under Commander John Hawley Glover at the Gold Coast
Surgeon-Major Samuel Rowe, engaged on the West Coast of Africa since 1862, and as Medical Officer and Chief of the Staff with Commander John Hawley Glover during the late Ashantee War
Captain Reginald William Sartorius, of the 6th Regiment of Bengal Cavalry, and lately serving against the Ashantees, under Commander John Hawley Grlover
Lieutenant John Henry Barnard, of the 19th Regiment of Infantry, also lately serving against the Ashantees, under Commander John Hawley Glover
Major William Augustus Tryden Helden, of the 100th Regiment of Infantry, lately selected for Special Service on the Gold Coast
Deputy Commissary Henry Frederick Blissett, having charge of the Stores and Transport at the Gold Coast, under Commander John Hawley Glover
Vice-Admiral Charles George Edward Patey, recently Governor and Commander-in-Chief of the Island of St. Helena
James Arndell Youl, of the Colony of Tasmania
Lieutenant-Colonel Henry Berkeley Fitzhardinge Maxse, Governor of the Island of Heligoland
Giovanni Battista Trapani  Collector of Land Revenue and Member of the Council of Government of the Island of Malta
Gordon Gairdner, sometime Chief Clerk in the Colonial Office, and Secretary and Registrar of the Most Distinguished Order of Saint Michael and Saint George
Sir George Barrow  lately Chief Clerk in the Colonial Office, and Secretary and Registrar of the Most Distinguished Order of Saint Michael and Saint George
Virgile Naz, Member of the Council of Government of the Island of Mauritius
Saul Samuel, Postmaster-General and Member of the Legislative Council of the Colony of New South Wales

References

Birthday Honours
1874 awards
1874 in India
1874 in the United Kingdom